Radhika Ranjan Pramanik (18 December 1932 – 13 December 2020) was an Indian politician belonging to the All India Trinamool Congress and was elected for five terms from Mathurapur, West Bengal to the Lok Sabha, lower house of the Parliament of India. He was earlier a member of the West Bengal Legislative Assembly from Magrahat Purba.

 He was expelled from the Communist Party of India (Marxist) after he accused  the party of encouraging corruption. Later, he joined Trinamool Congress.

References

External links
Official biographical sketch in Parliament of India website

1932 births
People from West Bengal
India MPs 1989–1991
India MPs 1991–1996
India MPs 1996–1997
India MPs 1998–1999
India MPs 1999–2004
Lok Sabha members from West Bengal
2020 deaths
People from South 24 Parganas district
Members of the West Bengal Legislative Assembly
Trinamool Congress politicians from West Bengal
Communist Party of India (Marxist) politicians from West Bengal
University of Calcutta alumni